Khalid bin Faisal bin Sultan Al Qassimi (born 18 February 1972) is a rally driver from the United Arab Emirates, and a member of the royal house of Al Qasimi who rule the Emirate of Ras Al Khaimah, and has competed in the World Rally Championship and Dakar Rally.

Early life
Al Qassimi was born on 18 February 1971. He is the son of Sheikh Faisal bin Sultan Al Qassimi and Sheikha Moza bint Hilal Al Nahyan.

Career

Sheikh Khalid Al Qassimi won the FIA Middle East Cup for Drivers of Production Cars in 2002 and the FIA Middle East Rally Championship in 2004.

At the half way stage of the 2007 World Rally Championship season, a joint venture between the BP Ford World Rally Team and the Abu Dhabi Tourism Board was announced to bring a third official Focus RS WRC to the team's World Rally Championship campaign. With heavy sponsorship from the latter, Khalid was given a chance to drive alongside Mikko Hirvonen and Jari-Matti Latvala in the extra car. Co-driven by Nicky Beech, Khalid Al Qassimi contested Rally Finland, Rallye Deutschland, Rally Catalunya and Rally Ireland. On his debut in Rally Finland, al-Qassimi drove consistently to finish in 16th place overall.

For the 2008 WRC season, he continued with BP Ford Abu Dhabi WRT, contesting ten events, co-driven by Michael Orr. His best result was ninth at the Jordan Rally. For 2009, Khalid Al Qassimi and co-driver Michael Orr remain with the BP Ford World Rally Team. His season began with a first world championship point by finishing in eighth place on the Rally Ireland; he repeated this feat in Cyprus and Portugal.

At the 2011 Rally Australia, he finished with a career-best 5th place. After a sabbatical year, he returned to the World Rally Championship in 2013, switching to an Abu Dhabi-sponsored Citroën DS3 WRC, claiming two ninth places and a tenth. In 2014 he took tenth place at Sardinia. In 2015 he finished sixth at the Rally Argentina and tenth at Sardinia. He also entered the Middle East Rally Championship with a Citroën DS3 RRC winning at Dubai and finishing second at Qatar and Kuwait.

In 2016, he finished sixth at the Abu Dhabi Desert Challenge.

Al Qassimi entered the 2017 Dakar Rally with a customer Peugeot 2008 DKR.

Titles

WRC results

PWRC results

References

External links

al-Qassimi at eWRC-results.com

1972 births
Living people
Emirati rally drivers
World Rally Championship drivers
Khalid Al Qassimi
Dakar Rally drivers
Citroën Racing drivers